Rwanda is a sovereign state in central and east Africa and one of the smallest countries on the African mainland. Rwanda's economy suffered heavily during the 1994 Rwandan Genocide, but has since strengthened. The economy is based mostly on subsistence agriculture. Coffee and tea are the major cash crops for export. Tourism is a fast-growing sector and is now the country's leading foreign exchange earner.

Notable firms 
This list includes notable companies with primary headquarters located in the country. The industry and sector follow the Industry Classification Benchmark taxonomy. Organizations which have ceased operations are included and noted as defunct.

See also
 List of supermarket chains in Rwanda
 Rwanda Over The Counter Exchange

References

Rwanda